Luca Marconi (born 13 July 1989) is an Italian motorcycle racer, he currently rides a Yamaha YZF-R1 in the European Superstock 1000 Championship and the Endurance FIM World Cup. He has competed in the 125cc World Championship and the Supersport World Championship.

Career statistics

Grand Prix motorcycle racing

By season

Races by year
(key) (Races in bold indicate pole position)

Supersport World Championship

By season

Races by year

External links
 Profile on MotoGP.com
 Profile on WorldSBK.com

1989 births
Living people
Italian motorcycle racers
125cc World Championship riders
Supersport World Championship riders
Sportspeople from Rimini
FIM Superstock 1000 Cup riders